Metropolitan West Financial was a diversified financial services holding company with interests in a variety of firms that provide financial advice and strategic planning, capital management, asset management, investment advice, and fixed-income portfolio management.

The acquisitive firm provides its services to businesses and high-net-worth individuals in the US. It has more than $65 billion in assets under management. Clients include Boeing Employees Credit Union, American Airlines, California Public Employees' Retirement System, and Microsoft.

In 2001, Former Vice President Al Gore took a position with Metropolitan West Financial, developing business strategies in the fields of information technology and biotechnology.

References 

Financial services companies based in California